Mário César may refer to:

 Mário César (footballer, born 1968), Brazilian football midfielder
 Mário César (footballer, born 1978), Brazilian football defender